Barry Maxwell, 1st Earl of Farnham PC (Ire) (1723 – 7 October 1800), styled The Honourable Barry Maxwell from 1756 to 1779, was an Irish peer and politician.

Background
He was the son of John Maxwell, 1st Baron Farnham and Judith Barry.

Political career
He was Prothonotary of the Court of Common Pleas between 1741 and 1800, was called to the Irish Bar in 1748 and was appointed a Bencher in 1757. On his brother's death in November 1779, he succeeded as 3rd Baron Farnham, inheriting the Farnham estate. He commissioned James Wyatt, one of the most fashionable architects of the time, to design a new house. These plans are now housed in the Metropolitan Museum of Art in New York.

He was created Viscount Farnham on 10 January 1781, Earl of Farnham on 22 June 1785, and became a Privy Councillor in Ireland on 6 June 1796. From 1756 to 1760 and again from 1768 to 1779, he sat in the Irish House of Commons for Cavan Borough. Between 1761 and 1768, he represented Armagh Borough.

Family
He married twice, firstly in January 1757 to Margaret King, daughter of Robert King of Drewstown. They had the following children:

 John James Maxwell, 2nd Earl of Farnham (5 February 1760 – 23 July 1823).
 Anne Maxwell; she married Richard Fox of Fox Hall in 1787.
 Judith Maxwell, died unmarried in 1818.
He then married secondly on 5 August 1771 to Grace Burdett, daughter of Arthur Burdett of Ballymaney. They had the following issue:
 Grace Maxwell (died 19 June 1866); she married Sir Ralph St George, 7th Baronet (1758–1842)
 Elizabeth Maxwell, died unmarried in January 1782.

On his death, he was succeeded by his son John James.

Notes

References 
Kidd, Charles, Williamson, David (editors). Debrett's Peerage and Baronetage (1990 edition). New York: St Martin's Press, 1990., 
 Maxwell family genealogy, part 03. showing the Maxwell of Calderwood, Maxwell of Farnham (co. Cavan), and Maxwell of Finnebrogue families.
 An examination into the principles contained in a pamphlet entitled The speech of lord Minto, with some remarks upon a pamphlet entitled Observations on that part of the speaker's speech which relates to trade- A pamphlet written by the Earl opposing the Act of Union 1800

External links 
 Cavan County Museum – The Farnham Gallery
 Farnham Estate

1723 births
1800 deaths
Earls in the Peerage of Ireland
Irish MPs 1727–1760
Irish MPs 1761–1768
Irish MPs 1769–1776
Irish MPs 1776–1783
Members of the Privy Council of Ireland
Members of the Parliament of Ireland (pre-1801) for County Cavan constituencies
Members of the Parliament of Ireland (pre-1801) for County Armagh constituencies
3
Younger sons of barons